Token Creek is an unincorporated community located in the town of Burke, Dane County, Wisconsin, United States. Wisconsin Highway 19 crosses east to west through the community

References

Geography of Dane County, Wisconsin
Populated places in Wisconsin